Dibble House may refer to:

 American Gothic House, in Eldon, Iowa
 Horace L. Dibble House, in Molalla, Oregon